Voousia punctifer is a moth in the family Cossidae, and the only species in the genus Voousia. It is found on Grenada, Dominica, St. Lucia and St. Vincent.

Etymology
The genus is named in honour of Prof. Dr. K . H . Voous.

References

Natural History Museum Lepidoptera generic names catalog

Zeuzerinae